Francisco José Villar Garcia-Moreno (February 25, 1948 in Madrid – October 26, 2011 in Madrid) was a Spanish politician of the People's Party (Spanish: Partido Popular).

Biography 
Although born in Madrid, much of his career was spent in Galicia.  He earned a Bachelor of Medicine and Surgery degree from the University of Santiago de Compostela.

His political career was closely linked to that of Mariano Rajoy.  In 1990, he was appointed Provincial Delegate of the Ministry of Health of the Government of Galicia in Pontevedra and in 1991-1996 served as Director General of the Galician Health Service.  In 1996, after the victory of the People's Party in the general election, he was appointed Secretary of State for Public Administration in the Ministry of Public Administration, which was led by Rajoy.  In subsequent years, he was appointed in a number of departments of the Central Government, where Rajoy was in charge.

He died on October 26, 2011 after a long illness.

Awards 
 Gold Medal of Sporting Merit (2002).

External links 
 Record in Congress of Deputies
 Profile in the World Journal of January 23, 1999

1948 births
2011 deaths
People's Party (Spain) politicians
University of Santiago de Compostela alumni